Princess Amelia or Princess Amelie may refer to:

People
 Princess Amelia of Great Britain (1711–1786), daughter of George II of Great Britain
 Princess Amelia of the United Kingdom (1783–1810), daughter of George III of the United Kingdom
 Princess Amélie Louise of Arenberg (1789 - 1823), member of the Palatinate-Birkenfeld-Gelnhausen line of the House of Wittelsbach, grandmother of Empress Elisabeth of Austria
 Princess Louise Amelie of Baden (1811 - 1854), daughter of Karl, Grand Duke of Baden and his wife Stéphanie de Beauharnais
 Princess Marie Amelie of Baden (1817 - 1888), youngest daughter of Karl, Grand Duke of Baden and Stephanie de Beauharnais, the adopted daughter of Napoleon I of France

Other
 HMS Princess Amelia, ships of the Royal Navy named after one of the above 
 Princess Amelia (1634 ship), a Dutch West India Company ship 
 Amelia Wil Tesla Seyruun, a character from the light novel series Slayers

See also 
Princess Amalia (disambiguation)